Ibrahim Walidjo Wassia (born 2 April 1989) is a Cameroonian footballer.

Club career
He played in Cameroon with Dragon Club, APEJES Academy and Renaissance FC de Ngoumou.

During the winter break of the 2012–13 season, he will move for first time to Europe, by joining FK Javor Ivanjica, a Serbian SuperLiga side.

He played with Greek clubs Panelefsiniakos and GAS Ialysos 1948 F.C. In summer 2018, he joined with Kosovo Superleague club Liria Prizren.

On 15 February 2019, Walidjo joined FK Bokelj.

International career
Ibrahim Walidjo made a debut for the Cameroonian national team in a friendly match against Angola in 2012.

Previously, he was part of Cameroon squad at the 2011 All-Africa Games.

References

External links
 
 Ibrahim Walidjo at Srbijafudbal

1989 births
Living people
Footballers from Yaoundé
Cameroonian footballers
Cameroon international footballers
Cameroonian expatriate footballers
Association football midfielders
Renaissance FC de Ngoumou players
FK Javor Ivanjica players
FK ČSK Čelarevo players
KF Liria players
FK Bokelj players
Serbian SuperLiga players
Football Superleague of Kosovo players
Serbian First League players
Expatriate footballers in Serbia
Expatriate footballers in Greece
Expatriate footballers in Cyprus
African Games bronze medalists for Cameroon
African Games medalists in football
Panelefsiniakos F.C. players
Competitors at the 2011 All-Africa Games